Ryan Tubridy (born 28 May 1973), nicknamed 'Tubs' is an Irish broadcaster. He presents The Ryan Tubridy Show, The Late Late Show And The Late Late Toy Show.

Tubridy previously presented RTÉ 2fm breakfast radio show The Full Irish, which at its end was the second most popular radio programme in Ireland. For five seasons from 2004 until 2009, he presented the Saturday night TV chat show Tubridy Tonight on RTÉ One. He later left RTÉ 2fm for a number of years to present The Tubridy Show on RTÉ Radio 1, but returned to RTÉ 2fm in 2010 to present a weekday morning radio show from 09:00 to 11:00, following the termination of The Gerry Ryan Show with the presenter's sudden death. He has also hosted the Rose of Tralee contest on two occasions.

As part of a two-book deal with HarperCollins—and in a nod to his passion for U.S. politics—Tubridy penned JFK in Ireland, a profile of U.S. President John F. Kennedy's 1963 visit to Ireland. Tubridy's second book, The Irish Are Coming, about the influence of Irish people in the UK, was published in 2013. With several wins and nominations at the Meteor Awards to his name, dating from his time as host of The Full Irish, Tubridy was named one of ten "icons" of 21st century Ireland by the Sunday Tribunes Derek O'Connor in 2008.

Background and early life

Birth and education
Born in Booterstown, Dublin, in 1973, Tubridy was educated at Carysfort National School and Blackrock College. He studied for his Bachelor of Arts (BA) in history and Greek and Roman civilisation at University College Dublin (UCD), where he was a member of the Fianna Fáil Kevin Barry Cumann and was active in the Students' Union and Belfield FM as well as the Dún Laoghaire branch of Ógra Fianna Fáil. Experienced in Greek and Latin, he was schooled alongside Craig Doyle and Ryle Nugent.

Ancestry
One of five children, Tubridy's siblings are Judith, Niall, Rachel and Garrett. Niall is a Professor of Clinical Medicine and one of the country's leading neurologists. Garrett ran unsuccessfully for the Pembroke-Rathmines ward of Dublin City Council at the 2009 local elections. During the election campaign Ryan was advised against making public appearances alongside his brother.

His father, Patrick Tubridy of Blackrock, who died in January 2013, was a medical practitioner and the only son of the Fianna Fáil TD Seán Tubridy (1897–1939). Seán Tubridy was the only son of Patrick Tubridy (1869–1920) and Jane Waldron (born 1868).

Tubridy's mother is Catherine (née Andrews), whose father, Todd Andrews, was a prominent associate of Fianna Fáil founder Éamon de Valera and held a number of posts in semi-state companies. A maternal uncle, Niall Andrews, was a TD and MEP, while another maternal uncle, David Andrews, was an Irish Government minister. Two of his first cousins, Barry Andrews and Chris Andrews, have also sat in Dáil Éireann as Fianna Fáil TDs, the former being a Minister of State for Children in the coalition government of Brian Cowen, since then becoming chief executive of aid charity GOAL, while the latter was re-elected to Dáil Éireann as a Sinn Féin member in 2020. Another first cousin, David Andrews Jr, is a comedian who works under the pseudonym of David McSavage.

Broadcasting career

Radio

RTÉ

Tubridy started in broadcasting at the age of 12, reviewing books for the RTÉ 2fm show Poporama presented by Ruth Buchanan. He earned £25 per show. After leaving college he became a runner in RTÉ, initially working on The Gerry Ryan Show as maker of tea and coffee. Tubridy said at the death of Gerry Ryan that "The moment I set foot in RTÉ, he put his wing around me and said: 'I like what you do. I like what you are. I'm going to look after you.'" He credits Ryan for his kindness "in a place which is so full of ego and bizarre resentment". Tubridy was also influenced by the "nerd made good" style of British broadcaster Chris Evans.

Later he worked as a reporter for Today with Pat Kenny, as well as occasionally presenting the radio news show Five Seven Live. In the summer of 1999, Tubridy presented Morning Glory on RTÉ Radio 1 and in July 2000 he moved to The Sunday Show. From 2002 until 2005 he presented RTÉ 2fm's morning breakfast show, The Full Irish. The move to the morning by Head of 2fm John Clarke was seen as risky, with station insiders disapproving and Hot Press publishing a double-page editorial with the headline "station in turmoil". Within one year its ratings had soared and Tubridy was given a major award. When The Full Irish ended it was the second most popular radio programme in Ireland, after Morning Ireland. Clarke later described moving Tubridy to the morning as the best decision of his 25-year career in radio.

In 2006, Tubridy began presenting The Tubridy Show, on weekday mornings on RTÉ Radio 1. Around this time, he wrote a column for the Sunday World in which he expressed amongst other things his support for Barack Obama, "one of his favourite singers" Fionn Regan and the success of Kenny Egan, a silver medal winning boxer at the 2008 Summer Olympics. He later interviewed Said Obama, the uncle of U.S. President Barack Obama for The Tubridy Show. Tubridy hinted he would consider moving to new pastures if the opportunity arose.

After the death of Gerry Ryan, Tubridy's friend and colleague, Turbridy was the subject of rumours by various newspapers that he would be succeeding him in the RTÉ 2fm slot, becoming RTÉ's top earner with a salary of 1 million. In June 2010, RTÉ confirmed that Tubridy would in fact fill that slot from August, presenting a programme called Tubridy from 09:00 to 11:00. His salary remained unchanged. In an RTÉ press release, he was quoted as saying: "In my new role on RTÉ 2fm I will be presenting a programme that will be very different, with a different time slot, and a different style of presenting." To allow for presenting The Late Late Show, his show was only two hours long, compared to the 3 hours that Gerry Ryan's show lasted. However JNLR figures released in July 2011 revealed Tubridy had lost over 110,000 listeners since the move.

After finishing The Tubridy Show on 16 July 2010, he began presenting Tubridy on RTÉ 2fm on 20 August 2010, surprising listeners by starting the programme three days earlier that what was originally scheduled for 23 August. His first guest on the programme was Bono. His RTÉ Radio 1 slot was filled by John Murray. Tubridy became synonymous with declining listenership figures, a 40% collapse of which by 2011 coincided with increased listenership figures for its rival The Ray D'Arcy Show.

In May 2011, the Broadcasting Authority of Ireland upheld a complaint against Tubridy who called a paedophile a "monster" and "creature" and added: "From what I gather these guys cannot be quote-unquote cured ... only one way to deal with them, and that's physiological ... these guys should have bits taken off."

Tubridy returned to RTÉ Radio 1 in September 2015 to host The Ryan Tubridy Show, an hour-long weekday morning show.

BBC
In July 2010, Tubridy's agent Noel Kelly confirmed that Tubridy was offered by the BBC to present a summer filler for Jonathan Ross's BBC Radio 2 programme. He turned down the offer citing preparations for The Late Late Show and the recent death of Gerry Ryan. It was confirmed that Tubridy would present the slot for 8 weeks from 23 July 2011, covering for Ross' replacement, Graham Norton.

Tubridy sacrificed his Christmas holidays in 2011 to work for the BBC again, this time as a replacement for Ken Bruce on Radio 2. Amid constant media criticism related to declining listenership and viewership figures, he received support from Chris Evans and was defended by Vincent Browne. Tubridy has also stood in for Chris Evans on the Radio 2 Breakfast Show, and Simon Mayo on the Radio 2 drivetime slot. In 2015, he has also stood in on Terry Wogan's weekend show on Sunday.

Greta Thunberg controversy

Tubridy attracted widespread criticism for remarks made about climate activist Greta Thunberg. Tubridy, In response to a passionate speech made by Thunberg to the UN, claimed that the 16-year-old was too young to be campaigning. "It's one thing campaigning, it's another thing causing anxiety to a generation" and added that he thought she should be brought home to “watch a movie”.

RTÉ pay-cut controversy
In 2008, Tubridy was the RTÉ presenter on the fourth highest salary, having received a 50% increase in his salary from the previous year.

Tubridy attracted criticism for his refusal to take a pay-cut in early 2009 even when colleagues such as Pat Kenny and Marian Finucane approved of their own salary cuts. He was soon the subject of a hate campaign on social networking site Facebook but later opted to take a 10 per cent pay cut. He is not an RTÉ employee, but is a contract employee and pays himself €283,756 a year from his production company, Tuttle Productions. He admits to not feeling particularly guilty about his €500,000 salary.

In March 2013, it was revealed he had earned €723,000 in 2011.
In December 2018, it was revealed that he earned €495,000 in 2016, his earnings did not increase from 2015.
In January 2021, it was revealed that he earned €495,000 for each of the previous three years.
In February 2023, it was revealed that he was still RTE's highest earner, being paid €466,250 in 2020 and €440,000 in 2021.

Television

Tubridy hosted the EsatBT Young Scientist and Technology Exhibition at the Royal Dublin Society, in 2003 and 2004. He also presented the Rose of Tralee competition, and a game show called All Kinds of Everything in 2003 and 2004. He presented the RTÉ People in Need Telethon in 2004 and 2007.

In October 2004, Tubridy Tonight began. This was his own live Saturday night talk show, seen as a successor to Kenny Live (formerly Saturday Night Live). Tubridy initially announced his intention to take over the hosting of The Late Late Show from Kenny but he later stated that he would remain as host of Tubridy Tonight, describing it as his "Jim'll Fix It job" and "little fun-size legacy". It was announced on 11 May 2009 that Tubridy would indeed succeed Pat Kenny as host of The Late Late Show. He vowed to bring back Gay Byrne's "one for everybody in the audience" catchphrase, described by Will Hanafin in the Irish Independent as an attempt to "dig up more old relics than archaeologists would on an excavation", in reference to Tubridy's passion for history. Tubridy said he was "very taken aback" to learn he had been selected, describing it as "a humbling honour to be asked to present such an iconic programme". His role as host allowed him to fulfill a childhood ambition – presenting The Late Late Toy Show – "I know this is the one that I always wanted. I love the fact that children are uncontaminated by the reality of adulthood". Tubridy Tonight concluded on 30 May 2009.

Tubridy's first guest on The Late Late Show was Taoiseach Brian Cowen, an interview that drew an audience share of 62 per cent. Gay Byrne, the original host, was one of Tubridy's guests in December 2009.

While hosting The Late Late Show, Tubridy has often clashed with his own guests, including Gordon Ramsay ("a bit, em, British for my liking"), Louis Walsh (giving Jedward a "hard time" on The Late Late Toy Show), Sinéad O'Connor (the "crazy performing monkey" incident), former MEP Paul Murphy (whose guest appearance contrasted glaringly with Miriam O'Callaghan's Prime Time interview of Enda Kenny the previous night) and Mia Farrow ("What's the matter with you anyway? Jesus!"). In May 2011, a former director of television at RTÉ, Helen O'Rahilly, said of The Late Late Show: "If I was back in charge of RTÉ, you wouldn't see this utter shite on Friday night".

In March 2012, Tubridy made his American television debut during which he discussed his book, JFK in Ireland.

On 16 March 2023, Tubridy announced that he would be stepping down as the presenter of The Late Late Show after 14 years. His last show will broadcast on 26 May at the end of the current season.

Writing
For more than €100,000 HarperCollins signed Tubridy as part of a two-book deal. They wanted an autobiography but he persuaded them otherwise. Tubridy's first book, the 302-page long JFK in Ireland, was launched at the Mansion House, Dublin on 27 October 2010. While researching the book, he discovered that Éamon de Valera had part of John F. Kennedy's speech to Dáil Éireann erased from the record after finding its content offensive. Tubridy's second book, The Irish Are Coming, about the influence of Irish people in the UK, was published by William Collins in 2013.

Tubridy co-wrote the title track, "We Are Where We Are", of Paddy Cullivan's extended play, released in October 2010. The writer and broadcaster commented: "Paddy is a pal and we would have conversations a lot over a pint of Guinness". He also sang a song on The Late Late Toy Show in 2010, becoming the first host to do such a thing.

Personal life
He lives in Monkstown in Dublin. He lived in a €1 million+ refurbished Victorian end-of-terrace house which measured 240 square metres (2,600 square feet), but put it up for sale in 2015, describing it as "too much" for him.

Family and relationships

Tubridy met his wife, the producer Anne Marie Power at RTÉ in 1997 when he spotted her in a recording studio. He later spoke of the moment they met: "She was going in to make a programme, I was going out. My head turned and my life changed. I pursued her relentlessly. She used to sashay down the corridor and I was quite taken by her. She was very erudite and she made documentaries on flamenco. She was much brighter than I am and continues to be, which isn't that hard really if you dig deep enough, and I asked her out." The couple had a daughter, Ella, and later married in 2003. Tubridy proposed in the Abbeyglen Hotel (a "favourite haunt" of his) in Clifden, County Galway. The engagement was announced in The Irish Times with the words "Ella Tubridy is delighted to announce the engagement of her parents Ryan and Anne Marie".

Tubridy separated from his wife in 2006. They have two children, Ella and Julia.

Since then he has been at various times involved with Aoibhinn Ní Shúilleabháin, a presenter of radio and television. Their romance was even referred to as "RyBhinn". Tubridy expressed his dissatisfaction when photos of the couple on a stroll at Powerscourt Waterfall were used by the press and was frustrated by subsequent claims that the photos were a publicity stunt. He later told the Evening Herald (in the week approaching his début as host of The Late Late Show) that Ní Shúilleabháin was "great support" and had transformed his life. In 2010 he told the same newspaper she was "my rock" since the death of friend and colleague Gerry Ryan. In December 2014, Tubridy's agent announced that he and Miss Ní Shúilleabháin had separated, saying 'Aoibhinn and Ryan are no longer together".

While hosting Tubridy Tonight, he spoke of the public's perception of him, saying: "I think I am a victim of my own image. I think it's been cultivated by others for me. I live in a very ordinary semi-detached house. People only ever see me on a Saturday night on TV and I'm in a smart suit with a book-lined backdrop so that's what they think – you're Johnny smart suit with a book-lined backdrop." Referring to the type of woman he would like, Tubridy said: "I like intelligence, I like a good conversation. I like elegance, I like a girl who is feminine without being vain, I like a little retro in terms of fashion and look and sprinkle it with a little sense of humour. I also love a girl who appreciates the darkness. I'm a lot darker than people think – plenty of dark humour."

Physical appearance
Tubridy has been subject to commentary about his physical appearance. He describes himself as a "young fogey". Podge and Rodge, a televised puppet chat show, commented on his "stupid awkward eyes, he reminds me of the undead" and introduced him as "South Dublin on a stick" when he appeared on their TV show.

In one incident Dermot Whelan, Dave Moore and Siobhan O'Connor of radio station 98FM rewrote the Steps song "Tragedy" to include lyrics which make personal references to Tubridy before playing it on their morning radio show. The song pokes fun at his famous ears as well as his hairstyle with the line: "His ears stand up like the FA Cup, he sits in his chair chatting with Holy Communion-style hair". Tubridy himself rang the show to congratulate Dermot, Dave and Siobhan on their achievement of "taking the mick out of him" with a song of "pure ego" that caused him to "burst out laughing when I saw it". He was less pleased when Gordon Ramsay, appearing as a guest on The Late Late Show, poked fun at his ears and weight; Tubridy later remarked on The Ray D'Arcy Show: "I thought he was a bit, em, British for my liking. I won't be buying the books [Ramsay was promoting]. In fact, I didn't take the free one".

Rhys Ifans and Howard Marks appeared on The Late Late Show on 1 October 2010 to discuss Mr. Nice, the British independent film in which Ifans portrayed Marks. The incident followed on from Ifans's playful request to buy Tubridy a drink. Tubridy said, "Uh absolutely" then tried to ask Ifans about his latest film. Ifans said, "It's called Neverland and uh, it's a prequel to Peter Pan. Yeah? OK? Are you familiar with that?" "I sure am" said Tubridy. "Because you've got very Peter Panny feet" Ifans continued. Tubridy thanked him for the compliment then Ifans smiled and said "Dainty little bugger" to laughter from the studio audience.

List of interests
Tubridy is a UNICEF ambassador. His love of reading means he has a special interest in childhood literacy. He has also been associated with the Society of Saint Vincent de Paul Toy Appeal.

After The Late Late Toy Show he has often sent his famous jumpers off to be auctioned for charity. The jumper he wore on his 2009 Toy Show debut found a suitable cause in the 2010 Haiti earthquake and was dispensed with on the radio programme Money. That jumper raised €1,050. The jumper he wore on the 2011 Toy Show he donated to the fund of artist Alexandra Trotsenko on the radio programme Liveline. €10,000 was raised for SVP from the auction of the infamous "Elf Christmas Jumper" after the 2012 edition of The Late Late Toy Show.

As well as his interest in the welfare of children, Tubridy has assisted in the promotion of other, more adult, initiatives, including the launch of a breast cancer initiative in May 2009. On 2 November 2011, he was MC and guest of honour for the launch of the Irish Film Archive Preservation Fund at the Irish Film Institute. The following month he helped switch on the Christmas lights on Grafton Street. In February 2015, he officially launched Galway's new Hand in Hand support centre which provides support and counselling services for parents of children with cancer.

Among his favourite films are The Queen and Frost/Nixon. One of his heroes is the British broadcaster Sir David Attenborough; prior to interviewing him on Tubridy Tonight  in March 2009, he said he "grew up watching his nature programmes". Noted for his passions for such things as U.S. politics (he took time off work to cheer on Barack Obama in that country's 2008 presidential election), Inspector Morse box sets (the lead character of which he described as "the morose and melancholic opera lover who deals with an inordinate amount of bloodshed in Oxford"), "real turf, the John Hinde donkey post card kind" and buying out-of-print history books on Amazon.com—appearing on Seoige and O'Shea in April 2008, he proclaimed his top three books of the previous year as The Road by Cormac McCarthy, Christine Falls by Benjamin Black and Exit Ghost by Philip Roth. He is fond of the humour of Gerry Ryan and the fictional character Ross O'Carroll-Kelly.

Views on the Internet
Tubridy has expressed his disdain for "anonymous cowards on the internet", those who operate "under the shadowy cover of names like Catman or Twenty Rothmans or whatever", and believes Wikipedia is "a fact-free bull run for any passing eejit to come along and add whatever fact or fiction they desire and up it goes onto the site". He prefers books instead.

A former member of Twitter, where he amassed more than 60,000 followers, was described by the Irish Independent as "one of Ireland's most famous Twits". Tubridy left the social networking and microblogging service on 9 August 2011, posting a late night farewell to his followers: "Dear Twitter, this is my last tweet. It's been lots of fun but I must leave. No drama, just not enough time. Thanks and take care. #goodbye. The Tubridy Radio Show and Late Late Show will have well attended Twitter accounts as I leave this curious social medium." After a five-year break, he returned to social media and created an Instagram account.
Ryan has many fans on a dedicated thread for his Radio Show on boards.ie.

Health
On 30 March 2020, RTÉ announced that Tubridy had tested positive for COVID-19. In a statement issued to RTÉ, Tubridy said "Like so many other people in Ireland, I tested positive, but I was in the very fortunate position to have a very unintrusive experience, which I now have come to the end of. While I've been at home watching television and listening to the radio, I have been bowled over by the extraordinary work of our front line heroes and their families who continue to make Ireland a healthier and safer place. I look forward to being back to work really soon." On 7 April 2020 he returned to work on his radio show saying that "I disappeared because I felt it was the right thing to do. And it was, in many ways, a useful thing for me to do because I was pretty tired anyway, and to take a couple of weeks to just to rest was really, a very, very good thing to do. I feel on top of the world today."

Awards
Tubridy won the Best Irish DJ category at the 2004 Meteor Awards for his breakfast show, The Full Irish.

Tubridy was named Best Male TV Presenter at the TV Now Awards in 2009. He collected the award for "Favourite Irish TV Show" from then girlfriend Ní Shúilleabháin, won by The Late Late Show at the 2010 awards.

The Dubliner magazine awarded him the title Dubliner of the Year in 2009.

His 19th-place finish in the 2009 Remus Uomo 100 Sexiest Irish Men List made headlines when his brother Garrett unexpectedly finished ahead of him in 10th.

Village named him 29th most influential person of 2009.

In February 2012, he came fifth in a poll to find Ireland's most desirable Valentines.

He has been encased in wax and put on public display at a museum on Dublin's College Green.

Tubridy is among a select number of people with their own Muppet.

He has had a calf named and auctioned in his honour.

References

External links
 
 Tubridy at RTÉ.ie
 The Late Late Show at RTÉ.ie

1973 births
20th-century Irish writers
21st-century Irish philanthropists
Living people
Alumni of University College Dublin
Ryan
Bibliophiles
Irish non-fiction writers
Irish male non-fiction writers
Irish radio presenters
Irish songwriters
Irish television talk show hosts
People educated at Blackrock College
People from Blackrock, Dublin
Rose of Tralee hosts
RTÉ 2fm presenters
RTÉ Radio 1 presenters
RTÉ television presenters
The Gerry Ryan Show